Istinye University was established in 2015 by the 21st Century Anatolian Foundation as the continuation of a 29-year knowledge and experience of the MLP Care Group which has brought three different hospital brands, namely, “Liv Hospital”, “Medical Park” and “VM Medical Park” under one roof.

The institution has two campuses, namely Topkapı Campus and Vadi Istanbul Campus. It uses İstinye University Hospital Medical Park Gaziosmanpaşa and İstinye University Hospital Liv Hospital Bahçeşehir as training hospitals.

Academic units

Faculties 
 Faculty of Dentistry
 Faculity of Pharmacy
 Faculty of Fine Arts, Design and Architecture
 Faculty of Humanities and Social Sciences
 Faculty of Economics, Administrative and Social Sciences
 Faculty of Communication
 Faculty of Engineering and Natural Sciences
 Faculty of Health Sciences
 Faculty of Medicine

Institutes 
 Institute of Graduate Education

Vocational schools 
 Vocational School of Health Services
 Vocational School

References 

Private universities and colleges in Turkey